William Arnold Barnett (born October 30, 1941) is an American economist, whose current work is in the fields of chaos, bifurcation, and nonlinear dynamics in socioeconomic contexts, econometric modeling of consumption and production, and the study of the aggregation problem and the challenges of measurement in economics.

Education
Barnett received his B.S. degree in mechanical engineering from M.I.T., his M.B.A. from the University of California, Berkeley, and his M.A. and Ph.D. from Carnegie Mellon University.

Positions
Barnett is currently the Oswald Distinguished Professor of Macroeconomics at the University of Kansas and Director of the Center for Financial Stability, in New York City.  He is also a Fellow of the IC² Institute at the University of Texas at Austin and a Fellow of the Johns Hopkins Institute for Applied Economics, Global Health, and the Study of Business Enterprise. He is the founder and President of the Society for Economic Measurement. He is also the Director of the Institute for Nonlinear Dynamical Inference at RUDN University in Moscow.

He was previously Research Economist at the Board of Governors of the Federal Reserve System in Washington, D.C.; Stuart Centennial Professor of Economics at the University of Texas at Austin; and Professor of Economics at Washington University in St. Louis.  Prior to becoming an economist, he worked from 1963 to 1969, as an engineer at Rocketdyne division of  the Rockwell International Corporation on development of the F-1 and J-2 rocket engines during Apollo program.

Research
His research is in macroeconomics and econometrics.  He is Founding President of the Society for Economic Measurement, Founding Editor of the Cambridge University Press journal, Macroeconomic Dynamics and of the Emerald Group Publishing monograph series, International Symposia in Economic Theory and Econometrics, and originator of the Divisia monetary aggregates and the "Barnett critique".

In consumer demand and production modelling, he originated the Laurent series approach to specification design and the seminonparametric approach using the Müntz–Szász theorem.  His publications on bifurcation analysis and nonlinear dynamics have shown that robustness of dynamical inferences is compromised, when policy simulations are run only at point estimates of parameters, since confidence regions about those estimates are often crossed by bifurcation boundaries.

He is a Fellow of the American Statistical Association, a Charter Fellow of the Journal of Econometrics, a Charter Fellow of the Society for Economic Measurement, a Fellow of the World Innovation Foundation, a Fellow of the IC² Institute, and a Fellow of the Johns Hopkins Institute for Applied Economics, Global Health, and the Study of Business Enterprise, and Honorary Professor at Henan University in Kaifeng, China.  He is ranked among the top 2% of the world's economists in RePEc.

His book with Nobel Laureate, Paul A. Samuelson, Inside the Economist's Mind: Conversations with Eminent Economists, Wiley-Blackwell Publishing (2007), has been translated into seven languages.  His MIT Press book, Getting It Wrong: How Faulty Monetary Statistics Undermine the Fed, the Financial System, and the Economy, won the American Publishers Award for Professional and Scholarly Excellence (the PROSE Awards) for the best book published in economics during 2012.

During January 2017, he was interviewed in depth about his life's work by Apostolos Serletis. A conference in his honor was held at the Bank of England on May 23–24, 2017.

Honorary journal special issues

Special issues of two eminent professional journals, the Journal of Econometrics and Econometric Reviews, have been published in Professor Barnett's honor with contribution by many of the world's most prominent economists. These journals are:
 Special issue of the Journal of Econometrics on the topic of "Internally Consistent Modeling, Aggregation, Inference, and Policy," coedited in honor of William A. Barnett by James Heckman and Apostolos Serletis, v. 183, no. 1, November 2014, pp. 1 – 146.
 Special issue of Econometric Reviews on the topic of "Econometrics with Theory: A Volume Honoring William A. Barnett," coedited by James Heckman and Apostolos Serletis, v. 34, no. 1-2, 2015, pp. 1 – 254.

Publications

Selected books

Selected journal articles

References

External links

 Barnett papers
 Personal web site
 Center for Financial Stability
 Society for Economic Measurement
 Blog

1941 births
Living people
Tepper School of Business alumni
MIT School of Engineering alumni
Haas School of Business alumni
Carnegie Mellon University alumni
Fellows of the American Statistical Association
University of Kansas faculty
20th-century American economists
21st-century American economists
Neoclassical economists
Monetary economists
University of Texas at Austin faculty
Johns Hopkins University fellows
Washington University in St. Louis faculty